Choji Murata (村田 兆治, 27 November 1949 – 11 November 2022) was a Japanese Nippon Professional Baseball pitcher. He played for the Tokyo/Lotte Orions over the period 1968 to 1990.

Murata led the Pacific League in Earned run average in 1975 and 1976. In 1976 he won 21 games, the only time he won 20 games or more in his career.

Overuse of Murata's pitching arm led to extreme pain and injury, and ultimately Murata was forced to undergo Tommy John elbow surgery, performed in 1982 by Dr. Frank Jobe in California. (Murata was the first Japanese pitcher to undergo the procedure.) As a result, Murata missed much of the 1982 season, all of the 1983 season, and most of the 1984 season during his recovery.

Rebounding in 1985 with a 17–5 record, Murata won the Nippon Professional Baseball Comeback Player of the Year Award. In 1989 he again led the Pacific League in ERA.

Retiring in 1990 with 200+ career wins, Murata became a member of Meikyukai. He was inducted into the Japanese Baseball Hall of Fame in 2005.

In 2008, Murata served on the Eiji Sawamura Award selection committee.

On 23 September 2022, Murata was arrested at Haneda airport for allegedly assaulting a customs agent. 

On 11 November 2022, Murata's house in Seijo, Setagaya, Tokyo, caught on fire during the early morning. Subsequently, he was taken to a hospital where he was pronounced dead due to carbon monoxide poisoning at age 72.

See also 
 List of top Nippon Professional Baseball strikeout pitchers

References

External links

Japanese Baseball Hall of Fame

1949 births
2022 deaths
Baseball people from Hiroshima Prefecture
Japanese baseball players
Nippon Professional Baseball pitchers
Tokyo Orions players
Lotte Orions players
Chiba Lotte Marines players
Japanese baseball coaches
Nippon Professional Baseball coaches
Japanese Baseball Hall of Fame inductees 
Deaths by smoke inhalation